Mosina  is a village in the administrative district of Gmina Dobrzany, within Stargard County, West Pomeranian Voivodeship, in north-western Poland.

References

Mosina